Effortel SA is a Mobile Virtual Network Enabler (MVNE) providing a platform-based transaction processing and management services for Mobile Virtual Network Operators (MVNO), and acts as an MVNO itself in partnership with Carrefour.

MVNE Services:
 voice,
 SMS,
 roaming,
 voicemail,
 billing and invoicing,
 payment handling,
 financial reporting,
 sales and marketing,
 customer care and self-care support.

The subsidiary Effortel Technologies provides MVNE services to Effortel subsidiaries and to other MVNOs and MNOs.

Effortel Technologies are headquartered in Brussels, Belgium, and employs 60 people. 
Effortel is offering technical solution that is designed taking into consideration CAPEX and OPEX cost controls:

 Single and centrally managed platform;
 Integrated and able to support numerous Mobile Network Operators across the globe; 
 Each MVNO can have its own service logic, tariffs, setup and processes.

Projects
Effortel is operating its own MVNO in partnership with an international retailer Carrefour in 4 countries. 
Projects sequence:
 Carrefour Mobile (Belgium), launched in February 2006, network Base (KPN);
 Uno Mobile (Italy), launched in June 2007, network Vodafone Italia;
 Carrefour Mova (Poland), launched in April 2008, network Polkomtel;
 Carrefour Telecom (Taiwan), launched in November 2008, network Chunghwa Telecom.

Effortel Technologies is also serving four other MVNOs - Daily Telecom and Optima  in Italy, FM Group Mobile in Poland, and Samatel in Oman.

Total number of Effortel customers is over 1 million.

Platform Architecture
Effortel Technologies platform provides the elements required for technical operation of MVNO - real time billing for both prepaid and postpaid, reporting, monitoring, invoicing, dunning, reconciliation, order management, Subscriber Identity Module management, Mobile number portability support, Customer relationship management, web self-care. Effortel Technologies owns Point of sale tools, enabling full POS-based postpaid signup process - ID check, number choosing, credit check, document management.

The platform can work with GSM, UMTS, CDMA, WiMax networks and is compliant with ETSI and NEBS standards.

The platform is open in terms of 3rd party integrations over web API’s or SOAP/XML.

The platform is hosted in Level3 top-security hosting facility in Brussels, Belgium.

Network Architecture: Integration with Mobile Network Operators
Effortel Technologies platform is integrated with 6 mobile operators: KPN in Belgium, Vodafone in Italy, Polkomtel in Poland, Chunghwa Telecom in Taiwan, Nawras in Oman and Bouygues in France.

The platform in Brussels is performing call control functions over SS7 signaling. Subscriber accounts, balances, data, call records are held and managed on the platform in Brussels. IVR and Voicemail systems are installed locally to avoid high-bandwidth voice traffic between the platform in Belgium and MVNOs in other countries. Effortel is able to launch MVNO in approximately 6 months.

Currently the platform has been integrated with networks built on elements from Nokia Siemens, Ericsson, Motorola, Huawei.

References

External links

Companies based in Brussels
Telecommunications companies of Poland
Companies of Italy